Road signs in Singapore closely follow those laid down in the traffic sign regulations used in the United Kingdom, although a number of changes over the years have introduced some slight deviations that suit local road conditions (such as fonts). Road signs in Singapore conform to the local Highway Code under the authority of the Singapore Traffic Police.

The Highway Code of Singapore Traffic Police is tested during the Basic Theory Test and Final Theory Test at either Ubi, Bukit Batok or Woodlands driving schools. The students are then to find either a school or private driving instructor to learn driving itself. Singaporean road signs depict people with realistic (as opposed to stylised) silhouettes.

No official name is given to the typeface used on all official signs, but they are likely based on a bold and narrow variant of the Charles Wright typeface, which is also used for vehicle registration number plates.

Since the mid-1990s, signs have been placed on a backing board making them square or rectangular and standardised to a width of 600 mm on most roads and 900 mm on expressways. Prior to the 1990s and after 1964, signs were cut out to their shape (e.g.: round signs were cut to be circular) as in most countries around the world. Prior to 1964, signs were in the pre-Worboys style with a couple of differences.

Singapore traffic signs use the English Language, one of the four official languages and the main language in the country. The three others – Malay, Chinese, and Tamil – and also Japanese are also used for important public places such as tourist attractions, airports and immigration checkpoints.

Warning signs 

Warning signs indicate possible dangers or unusual conditions ahead and alert motorists, so they may anticipate the appropriate actions to take. They are usually shaped as triangles with a red border, and mounted on a borderless white backing board, which is similar to the United Kingdom traffic sign.

Regulatory signs 
Regulatory signs either give positive instructions, i.e. Mandatory signs, or indicate a prohibition, i.e. Prohibitionary signs. Many regulatory signs are accompanied by supplementary plates that provide interdependent exceptions to the rule, or indicates additional instruction or information to facilitate understanding of the rule implemented.

Mandatory signs 
Mandatory signs are generally circular with a white border and symbol on a blue background. They usually indicate something all drivers must do (e.g. keep left) or a facility available to certain classes of traffic (e.g. pedal cycles only). 

The exceptions are the octagonal red STOP sign, the temporary STOP and GO signs and the triangular GIVE WAY sign.

Prohibitory signs 
Prohibitory signs, which generally tell drivers what they must not do, are mostly circular and have a red border. The red ring indicates the prohibition; diagonal bars are used only on signs which prohibit a specific manoeuvre, i.e. banned left or right turns and U-turns, or a certain class of vehicle, i.e. lorries (some signs looks similar to design of Australia).

Diagonal bars are excluded when restrictions are quantitative in nature, i.e. limits in speed, weight, axle, height, and width.

Information signs 
Information signs are signs that may be mounted to indicate a certain condition or nature of the road ahead that motorists need to take note. They are independent of existing mandatory and prohibitive signs. Such signs are usually white or blue and rectangular in shape.

Temporary work-zone signs 
Temporary work-zone signs (designated in amber orange signages) are mounted to ensure road users are notified in advance despite being affected by road works in the vicinity. It closely follows the American MUTCD traffic sign (e.g. vermillion diamond, vermillion rectangular or amber rectangular-shaped signs).

Directional signs 
Signs indicating destinations reached via expressways has white lettering on a blue background.
Signs indicating destinations reached via other roads have white lettering on a green background.
Signs indicating local destinations have black lettering on a white background.
Signs indicating recreational facilities and landmarks have white lettering on a brown background.

Road markings

Along the side of the road

Road dividers

Zebra crossing rules 

Two flashing Belisha Beacon are positioned, one on each side of the road, at a zebra crossing, 
which flashes from 7 pm to 7 am daily, indicating to an approaching motorist of a zebra crossing.
Older crossings display the blue square zebra crossing signs on both sides (see above), which are synonymous to the flashing amber beacons, and are valid yet uncommon on the roads.
The road markings and road dividers are white zig-zag lines that indicate a zebra crossing in the vicinity, similar to the United Kingdom and Republic of Ireland Zebra crossing rules. 

On approach, regardless of the absence of any pedestrians, all motorists are required to keep left of the divider, prepare to stop and stay in their respective lanes, i.e. no overtaking is permitted.

When pedestrians are present at the side of a zebra crossing, all motorists are obligated to give priority to pedestrians crossing the zebra crossing bars, by stopping before the white line across the lane. No waiting is permitted within the vicinity of the zebra crossing. 

A sign indicating a pedestrian crossing or a 'SLOW' painted on the road may be present as well.

Obsolete

Post-Worboys

Pre-Worboys

See also
Road names in Singapore

References
 Singapore Official Highway Code (Basic Theory of Driving) Seventh Edition.  . Published 2008 by Pacific Communications Pte Ltd under the authority of the Traffic Police.

External links 
LTA Feedback Portal
 Provides information about LTA, major projects and other services

Signs
Singapore